Robert McDermott is professor of Philosophy and Religion at the California Institute of Integral Studies in San Francisco. He received his Ph.D. in 1969 in philosophy from Boston University and is president emeritus of the California Institute of Integral Studies. He has taught at Manhattanville College (1964–71) and is professor emeritus and former chair of the Department of Philosophy at Baruch College, CUNY (1971–90).  He was secretary of the American Academy of Religion (1968–71) and secretary treasurer of the Society for Asian and Comparative Philosophy (1972–76).

With Arthur Zajonc, McDermott is co-founder of The Owen Barfield Graduate School of Sunbridge College, is the founding chair of the board of Sophia Project (two homes in Oakland, California, for mothers and children at risk of homelessness), and has been chair of the board and president of many other institutions. He is a teacher and former board chair of the Rudolf Steiner Institute.

He has written a number of books, as well as essays published in scholarly journals and anthologies.  His essays have appeared in International Philosophical Quarterly, Cross Currents, Journal of the American Academy of Religion, and Philosophy East and West.

Topics on which he has written or lectured include the evolution of consciousness, the spiritual mission of America, classic and modern spirituality and spiritual masters (East and West), Sri Aurobindo, and Rudolf Steiner and Anthroposophy.

McDermott's term as president of CIIS marked an extraordinary achievement.  He was the first president in its history who filled out his terms of office without resigning or being dismissed (not counting the founder and first President, the Bengali scholar Dr. Haridas Chaudhuri, who expired in his office in 1975 while writing a student, shortly after teaching his last class in Modern Brain Research and Psychodynamics). McDermott was able to steer a very  small and vulnerable institution away from the very edge of dissolution in bankruptcy into the thriving institution that it is today, nearly quadrupling its enrollment subsequent to McDermott's resignation.

Partial bibliography
Radhakrishnan (1970)
The Essential Aurobindo (1974)
The Essential Steiner (1984)
 Introduction to William James, Essays in Psychical Research (1986)
 Four books published by Steinerbooks:

The Bhagavad Gita and the West (2006)
Buddha and Christ (2007)
The New Essential Steiner (2007)
Steiner and Anthroposophy (2008)

External links
 Robert McDermott's faculty bio at CIIS. Accessed 2016-11-02.
 Essay "William James and Rudolf Steiner" by Robert A. McDermott. Accessed March 22, 2021.

Integral thought
Living people
Manhattanville College faculty
Year of birth missing (living people)
Western esotericism scholars